Strip is the second solo studio album by Adam Ant, and counting his work with Adam and the Ants, his fifth studio album.  It was released in 1983 and a stylistic departure from Ant's previous musical efforts.  This record is much less rock-oriented and more grounded in pop and dance.  Ant continued his songwriting collaboration with Marco Pirroni for the album.  Along with Richard James Burgess and Ant, Pirroni was one of the album’s main producers. The album did not perform as well in Ant's home country as his previous albums and performed modestly in the US. Critics generally reviewed it unfavorably.

Production 
Phil Collins plays drums on "Puss 'n Boots" and "Strip", Collins also aided in production duties for the two tracks he played on, and enlisted Hugh Padgham to assist with the production and engineering of those sessions. Singer Anni-Frid Lyngstad, of ABBA fame, also performs the female spoken part on "Strip".

Content 
The cover photograph was fashioned after actress Jane Russell's famous photo from Howard Hughes's 1943 film The Outlaw.

Release 
The lead single from the album in Europe and Australia was "Puss 'n Boots", which continued the pantomime themes and fashions of Ant's earlier work. The single reached number 5 on the UK chart in 1983, becoming Ant's final UK top 10 hit, although other top 20 hits would follow. The title track, "Strip" was released as a single in 1984 and reached number 41 on the UK singles chart and number 42 in the U.S. "Puss 'n Boots" was also released as a single in the U.S., but failed to chart. "Playboy" was planned to be the third single.

Reception

From contemporary reviews, Ian Birch wrote in Smash Hits that the new songs on the album feature a "new and much fresher style" from Adam Ant, specifically noting "more thoughtful writing,  more adventurous arrangements" and "sharper singing while the "obsession with sex gets a bit ridiculous but if you keep a sense of humour, it soon fades into the background."

Tour 
An extensive tour of the U.S. was undertaken after the release. Ant settled on a deal with his tour manager, Michael Kleffman, that would give him a pay bonus if the album or the following album peaked within the top 20 on the U.S. Billboard 200. Neither the album nor its follow-up, Vive Le Rock, managed to do so, with the former peaking at #65 and the latter peaking at #131.

Some performances of the tour can be found on YouTube. It was the biggest American tour of Ant's career, with dates in many cities, and was famous for the showmanship involved; this included a vine-covered bridge suspended above the audience, and a Houdini-style immersion tank, which Ant would jump in and emerge from wearing only black shorts – after "stripping" his stage costume off during the course of the show.

Track listing
All songs written by Adam Ant and Marco Pirroni.

"Strip" – 3:48
"Baby, Let Me Scream at You" – 4:07
"Libertine" – 4:19
"Spanish Games" – 3:00
"Vanity" – 4:08
"Puss 'n Boots" – 3:52
"Playboy" – 3:50
"Montreal" – 4:23
"Navel to Neck" – 3:41
"Amazon" – 3:50

 Additional tracks on the 2005 remaster
<LI>"Strip" (Demo Version)
<LI>"Dirty Harry" (Demo Version)
<LI>"Horse You Rode in On" (Demo Version)
<LI>"She Wins Zulus" (Demo Version)
<LI>"Puss 'n Boots" (Demo Version)
<LI>"Playboy" (Rehearsal)
<LI>"Navel to Neck" (Rehearsal)
<LI>"Strip" (Live)

Personnel
Adam Ant – vocals, bass guitar, production
Marco Pirroni – guitar, production
Richard James Burgess – drums, keyboards, percussion, production
Phil Collins – drums, percussion, production
Anni-Frid Lyngstad – additional vocals

 Technical
 Hugh Padgham – production, recording, engineering
 Anders Andersson – production assistance
 Jean-Luc Fauvel – production assistance
 Radu Wouk – production assistance
 Mark Freegard - engineer
 Michael B. Tretow – audio mixing
 Allan Ballard - photography

Chart positions

References

External links 
 

1983 albums
Adam Ant albums
Albums produced by Hugh Padgham
Albums produced by Phil Collins
Albums produced by Richard James Burgess
Columbia Records albums